André Auville (21 April 1912 – 27 June 1993) was a French racing cyclist. He rode in the 1937 Tour de France.

References

1912 births
1993 deaths
French male cyclists
Place of birth missing